The Parliament of Saint Lucia is the bicameral legislative branch of the government of Saint Lucia. It consists of the King, who is represented by the governor general), and the 2 parts of the legislature, the Senate and the House of Assembly. 

The House of Assembly, the lower chamber, has 17 elected members who each represent a constituency with terms lasting no more than 5 years. The Senate, the upper chamber, has 11 members who are appointed by the governor general based on their own judgement, as well based on the advice of the prime minister and the leader of the opposition.

Composition

Parliament consists of three different elements:

The monarch, represented by a viceroy, the Governor General
The Senate, the upper chamber
The House of Assembly, the lower chamber

Monarch

The sovereign's role in parliament is ceremonial, with neither the sovereign nor their viceroy (the governor general), participating in the legislative process. However, Royal Assent is still necessary for a bill to become law.

Senate 

The Senate is the upper house of parliament, consisting of 11 members appointed by the governor general. Six members are appointed based on the advice of the prime minister, whilst three members are appointed based on the advice of the leader of the opposition. The other two members are appointed by the governor general based on his or her own judgement. To be appointed as a senator, one must be at least 21 years old.

House of Commons

The House of Assembly is the lower house of parliament, with each member being elected via a plurality of voters in each of the country's  17 constituencies. Members of the House must be at least 21 years old. A parliamentary term lasts no more than 5 years, but Parliament may be dissolved at any time.

See also

Politics of Saint Lucia
List of national legislatures

References

External links
 

Politics of Saint Lucia
Political organisations based in Saint Lucia
Government of Saint Lucia
Saint Lucia
Saint Lucia
Saint Lucia